Four Corners, California may refer to:
 Four Corners, Contra Costa County, California
 Four Corners in the Lake View District of Lake Elsinore, California, where the city's first four-way traffic light was installed

See also 
 List of places in California (F)